Keith Gattis is the self-titled debut album of American country music singer Keith Gattis. It was released in 1996 via RCA Records. The album includes the singles "Little Drops of My Heart", which peaked at number 53 on Hot Country Songs, and "Real Deal".

Critical reception
Chuck Hamilton of Country Standard Time gave the album a positive review, saying that Gattis "covers a variety of hard country styles and has the vocal equipment to handle it all convincingly." It received 4.5 stars out of 5 from Michael McCall of Allmusic, who compared Gattis' voice favorably to Johnny Paycheck and George Jones.

Track listing
All songs written by Keith Gattis except as noted.
"Real Deal" (Gattis, Jim Dowell) — 3:08
"Everywhere I See You There" — 3:25
"The Puppet" — 3:32
"Back in Your Arms" — 3:12
"Whoop-De-Do" (Jeff Carson, Buddy Blackmon, Vip Vipperman) — 2:50
"Little Drops of My Heart" — 3:51
"Scrapin' Off the Pain" — 3:23
"Heartache Hero" (Kim Williams, Ron Harbin, Kim Tribble) — 2:46
"Only Lonely Fool" — 3:32
"Look Out Below" (Gattis, James T. Heffernan) — 2:42

Personnel
Compiled from liner notes.

Musicians
Harold Bradley — tic tac bass
Mark Casstevens — acoustic guitar
Glen Duncan and Rob Hajacos — twin fiddles
Keith Gattis — vocals, acoustic guitar
Paul Leim — drums
Larry Marrs — bass guitar, background vocals
 Brent Mason — electric guitar
Hargus "Pig" Robbins — piano
Hal Rugg — steel guitar
Marty Stuart — mandolin

Technical
Don Cobb — digital editing
Carlos Greer — digital editing
Joe Hayden — assistant engineer
Amy Hughes — assistant engineer
Ken Hutton — assistant engineer
Sandy Jenkins — assistant engineer
Tom King — assistant engineer
John Kunz — assistant engineer
Warren Peterson — overdubs
Denny Purcell — mastering
Chris Rowe — digital editing
Steve Sexton — assistant engineer
Dave Sinco — overdubs
Brian Tankersley — mixing
Rhett Travis — assistant engineer
King Williams — assistant engineer
Norro Wilson — producer

Chart performance

References

1996 debut albums
RCA Records albums
Keith Gattis albums
Albums produced by Norro Wilson